The  (Ghost Variations), or Theme and Variations in E-flat major for piano, WoO 24, composed in 1854, is the last piano work of Robert Schumann. The variations were composed in the time leading up to his admission to an asylum for the insane and are infrequently played or recorded today.

History

This was Schumann's last work before he was admitted to the mental hospital in Bonn-Endenich. Wolf-Dieter Seiffert wrote in the preface to  that at this time of his life, Schumann believed that he was surrounded by spirits who played him music, both "wonderful" and "hideous". They offered him "most magnificent revelations", but also threatened to send him to Hell. Seiffert goes on to write that on 17 or 18 February 1854, Schumann wrote down a theme he said was dictated to him by voices like those of angels. He did not recognize that it was actually a theme which he had composed previously. Several days later, he wrote a set of variations on this theme. While he was still working on the composition, on 27 February he suddenly threw himself half clothed into the freezing Rhine river, from which he was rescued and returned home. After surviving the suicide attempt, he continued to work on it. The next day, he completed the work and sent the manuscript to his wife, Clara, who had left him the night before, on the advice of a doctor.

Movements

 Theme –  (Quiet, earnest)
 Variation I
 Variation II –  (Like a canon)
 Variation III –  (Somewhat more animated)
 Variation IV
 Variation V

Works which quote WoO 24

Brahms: Variations on a Theme of Robert Schumann, piano four hands, Op. 23
Aribert Reimann: Seven Fragments for Orchestra in memory of Robert Schumann (1988)
Tori Amos: "Your Ghost" (Night of Hunters, 2011)

References

External links

Piano music by Robert Schumann
Compositions for solo piano
1854 compositions
Compositions in E-flat major
Variations